The 45th National Film Awards will be presented on 23 March 2022 by Ministry of Information, Bangladesh to felicitate the best of Bangladeshi films released in the calendar year 2020. The list of winners were declared on 16 February 2022.

Submissions
The deadline for submitting films for the National Film Award 2020 was on 19 September 2021. 14 full-length feature films, 7 short films and 6 documentaries were submitted.

Lifetime Achievement

List of winners

References

External links

National Film Awards (Bangladesh) ceremonies
2020 film awards
2022 awards in Bangladesh